Cave Rock (foaled March 12, 2020) is a multiple Grade I winning American Thoroughbred racehorse who won the Grade I American Pharoah Stakes and Del Mar Futurity as a two-year-old.

Background
Cave Rock is a dark bay or brown colt that was bred in Kentucky by Anne and Ronnie Sheffer Racing. He was sired by Arrogate, the 2016 American Champion three-year-old colt, in his second year at stud. Cave Rock is trained by trainer Bob Baffert who with bloodstock agent Donato Lanni selected Cave Rock for the partnership, which buys horses in the name of Three Amigos – Karl Watson, Michael E. Pegram & Paul Weitman. They purchased the colt from Gainesway for $550,000 at the 2021 Keeneland September yearling sale. His dam Georgie's Angel, won the 2011 Schuylerville Stakes at Saratoga for the breeders of Cave Rock, Anne and Ronnie Sheffer Racing who were part owners of mare. Georgie's Angel has produced four winners from five starters, including three-time winner Take Charge Angel, an earner of $166,055. The mare has a yearling colt by Arrogate and a weanling filly by Improbable. She was bred to Connect this year.

The name Cave Rock comes from a historical landmark near Lake Tahoe in Nevada.

Racing career

2022: two-year-old season
Cave Rock began his career on August 13 at Del Mar Racetrack in a Maiden Special Weight event for two-year-olds over a distance of six and one-half furlongs facing eight other first-starters. Cave Rock started as the 6/5 favorite Cave Rock got bumped from outside at the start by Alexander Helios. He moved to the front and set the pace up the backstretch extending his lead around the turn and was coaxed lightly in upper stretch by jockey Juan Hernandez winning easily by six lengths in a time of 1:15.81.

Cave Rock's next start was on September 11 in the Grade I Del Mar Futurity at Del Mar over a distance of seven furlongs. From the start Cave Rock verged to the lead with Havnameltdown posting fractions for the first quarter-mile in :21.56 and the half-mile in :43.56. In the stretch, Cave Rock drew away from Havnameltdown winning by  lengths in stakes record time of 1:20.99, surpassing the previous record by Declan's Moon of 1:21.29 in 2004. The Hall of Fame trainer Bob Baffert won his 16th Del Mar Futurity.

With such a commanding performance Bob Baffert entered Cave Rock in the Grade I American Pharoah Stakes at Santa Anita Park over a distance of one and one-sixteenth miles. On October 8, 2022, Cave Rock was sent of as the 2/5 odds-on faced seven other entrants including three other Bob Baffert trainees. Cave Rock broke nicely set fractions of :22.96, :46.82, and 1:11.07 while the other Baffert runners ran behind him. Hejazi raced outside of National Treasure, and Gandolfini, who broke from the rail, remained on the inside. Cave Rock's early -length margin became  lengths after six furlongs, and then Cave Rock's lead continued to increase winning by  lengths in a time of 1:43.05, the fastest time since 2014 when American Pharoah won the event. By winning the American Pharoah Stakes, Cave Rock qualified to the Breeders' Cup since the event is a "Win and You're In" race for the GI Breeders' Cup Juvenile.

Statistics

Notes:

An (*) asterisk after the odds means Cave Rock was the post-time favourite.

Pedigree

References

2020 racehorse births
Racehorses bred in Kentucky
Racehorses trained in the United States
Thoroughbred family 8-h
American Grade 1 Stakes winners